Puškarić is a Croatian surname.

It is the third most common surname in the Karlovac County of Croatia.

It may refer to:

 Darko Puškarić, Serbian football player

References

Serbian surnames
Croatian surnames